Bremer is a Germanic surname referring to residents of Bremen, Germany.

Notable people who share the surname "Bremer" 

Andrew Bremer (born 1995), American Paralympic soccer player
Anne Bremer (1868–1923), American painter
Arthur Bremer (born 1950), American attempted assassin of George Wallace
Birgitta Bremer (born 1950), Swedish botanist
Caj Bremer (born 1929), Finnish photographer and photojournalist
Chris-Carol Bremer (born 1971), former German Olympic swimmer
Dagmar Bremer (born 1963), German field hockey player
Dick Bremer (born 1956), American sports broadcaster
Edith Terry Bremer (1885–1964), American women's rights activist
Eli Bremer (born 1978), American modern pentathlete
Frédéric Bremer (1892–1982), Belgian neuroscientist
Frederick Bremer (1872–1941), English inventor and engineer
Fredrika Bremer (1801–1865), Swedish novelist
Gene Bremer (1916–1971), American Negro league baseball pitcher
Gerhard Bremer (1917–1989), German Waffen-SS officer during World War II
Gordon Bremer (1786–1850), British naval officer
Herb Bremer (1913–1979), American baseball catcher
J. R. Bremer (born 1980), American basketball player
Jacob Bremer (1711–1785), Swedish merchant
John Bremer (1927–2015), English classics educator
Jürgen Bremer (born 1940), German slalom canoeist
Kåre Bremer (born 1948), Swedish botanist
Karl Heinz Bremer (1911–1942), German historian
Kristen Kyrre Bremer (1925–2013), Norwegian theologian and bishop
Lucille Bremer (1917–1996), American actress
Martin Bremer (born 1970), German long-distance runner
Otto Bremer (1867–1951), German American banker and philanthropist
Otto Vasilievich Bremer (died 1873)  Russian naturalist and entomologist
Paul Bremer (born 1941), American diplomat and former administrator of the Iraqi Coalition Provisional Authority
Pauline Bremer (born 1996), German footballer
Ronnie Bremer (born 1978), Danish racecar driver
Sebastiaan Bremer (born 1970), Dutch visual artist
Tor Bremer (born 1955), Norwegian politician
Ulrika Fredrika Bremer (1746–1798), Finnish ship owner and merchant
Undine Bremer (born 1961), German sprinter
Väinö Bremer (1899–1964), Finnish biathlete and modern pentathlete